"Begin Again" is a song written and recorded by American singer-songwriter Taylor Swift for her fourth studio album, Red (2012). It was released as the second single from Red on October 1, 2012, by Big Machine Records. Produced by Swift, Dann Huff, and Nathan Chapman, "Begin Again" is a gentle country and soft rock ballad with acoustic guitar, steel guitar, and percussion. Its lyrics are about falling in love again after a failed, toxic previous relationship.

Music critics praised the gentle production, the narrative songwriting, and welcomed Swift's mature perspective on love. "Begin Again" was nominated for Best Country Song at the 56th Annual Grammy Awards in 2014. In the United States, the single peaked at number seven on the Billboard Hot 100 and was certified platinum by the Recording Industry Association of America (RIAA). It peaked at number four on the Canadian Hot 100 and was certified gold by Music Canada (MC).

The song's accompanying music video was directed by Philip Andelman. Shot in Paris, the video depicts Swift strolling around the city with a male love interest. Swift performed "Begin Again" live at the 2012 Country Music Association Awards and included the song on the set list of the Red Tour (2013–2014). She released a re-recorded version of the song, titled "Begin Again (Taylor's Version)", as part of her 2021 re-recorded album Red (Taylor's Version).

Background and release
Swift quipped that the song is "about when you've gotten through a really bad relationship and you finally dust yourself off and go on that first date after a horrible breakup, and the vulnerability that goes along with all that". She previewed it on Good Morning America on September 24, 2012, and was released digitally on iTunes the next day, September 25. The song initially served as a promotional single, the first of four tracks to be released during the four weeks preceding the release of her fourth studio album Red. It was later announced that the song would be the second single from Red. An individually numbered CD single was released on October 23, 2012, exclusively to Amazon.com and Swift's official store.

Composition and lyrics

Produced by Swift, Dann Huff, and Nathan Chapman, "Begin Again" is a country and soft rock ballad. It incorporates steel guitar, arpeggiated acoustic guitar, and gentle percussion in its production. Marc Hogan from Spin remarked that the instruments resemble the music of 1970s soft rock singer-songwriters Joni Mitchell and James Taylor, the latter of whom is referenced to in the lyrics, "You said you never met one girl who had as many James Taylor records as you / But I do". The country-music production is accentuated by mandolin and banjo. Lindsay Zoladz from The New York Times found the song to feature a "coffee shop folksiness".

The lyrics of "Begin Again" are about a protagonist falling in love again after a failed relationship. Swift told Good Morning America about the song's content, "It's actually a song about kind of when you've gotten through a really bad relationship and you finally dust yourself off and go on that first date after a horrible breakup and the vulnerability that goes along with all of that." The narrator compares her ex-lover to a new love interest, "I think it's strange that you think I'm funny, because he never did." Billy Dukes from Taste of Country remarked that the narrator of "Begin Again" is willing to reveal her vulnerability to the new lover, which makes the song touching.

As noted by critics, "Begin Again" finds Swift writing about optimism and hope in a new love after enduring heartbreak and tumultuous feelings from toxic relationships. Musicologist James E. Perone observed that "Begin Again", placing as the final track on the standard edition of Red, serves as the thematic conclusion to the album—after exploring the intensity of new relationships on the first tracks and the messy complications of such "red" tumultuous relationships on the following songs, the album concludes with a song focusing on a relationship that is deeper and potentially more lasting. The country-music production, according to Perone, confirms the significance of Swift's country roots on the genre-spanning, pop-oriented Red.

Critical reception
"Begin Again" received widespread acclaim from music critics, many of whom praised Swift's songwriting. Perone found the lyrics "wide-ranging and free-ranging" and deemed the track an appropriate album closer for Red. Writing for Taste of Country, Billy Dukes gave the song a four star rating out of five, describing it as "a cleansing breath that hopefully foreshadows the true tone of her album". Grady Smith of Entertainment Weekly wrote the song is "a well-crafted love story" and noted Swift's talent "at taking a single moment in time and letting it unfold like a pop-up storybook." Matt Bjorke gave four out of five stars as well for Roughstock, complimenting that "The song is a vast improvement for Taylor. A ballad that's neither in-your-face or sounding like its from a twelve year old".

The Boot noted that the story Swift painted was "sweet" and it's a "beautiful ballad". MuchMusic lauded Swift, stating "while she is more than capable of releasing the carefree, jump-around-your-room-with-a-hairbrush break up songs like "We Are Never Ever Getting Back Together," she also has the pen of a poet and knows how to craft emotionally gut-wrenching songs that speak to her millions of fans." Billboard magazine ranked "Begin Again" at number six on their list of the best songs of 2012, praising Swift's artistic maturity. Rob Sheffield from Rolling Stone called the track "a deceptively simple ballad that sneaks up and steamrolls all over you".

Awards and nominations

Commercial performance

"Begin Again" debuted at number one on the Hot Digital Songs chart selling 299,000 digital copies in the week ending September 30, 2012; it was Swift's fifth chart topper. On the Billboard Hot 100 chart dated October 4, 2012, the single debuted at number seven, becoming her 12th Hot 100 top-10 entry as well as ninth top-10 debut. It remained on the Hot 100 for 20 weeks. On the Hot Country Songs chart dated October 13, 2012, "Begin Again" debuted at number 37 with first-week audience of three million. For the next week's issue, Billboard incorporated digital sales and streaming data to the Hot Country Songs chart, in addition to only airplay data as previously done. As a result, "Begin Again" jumped to number 10 on Hot Country Songs (which later became its peak position), and appeared at number 29 on the newly-revamped Country Airplay chart, which replaced the aforementioned chart as the country-airplay-only ranking. The single ultimately peaked at number three and spent 22 weeks on the Country Airplay chart. The Recording Industry Association of America in March 2013 certified the track platinum. According to Billboard, by November 2017, it has sold one million digital US copies.

The song attained moderate success worldwide. "Begin Again" became Swift's sixth top five hit in Canada, debuting at number four. It debuted in Australia at number twenty on the week ending September 30, 2012. In the United Kingdom, the song gave Swift her second top 40 hit from Red after debuting at number 30, following "We Are Never Ever Getting Back Together" which peaked at number 4. In New Zealand, the song reached number ten. In Ireland and Spain, the song reached number twenty-five and number thirty respectively.

Music video
The music video for "Begin Again" premiered on MTV on October 23, 2012. Swift chose to film the video in Paris as a "love letter" in tribute to the city, " 'Cause it's just the city and this storyline of somebody moving on and finding yourself again." The video starts with Swift standing on a bridge while pensively gazing across the water and remembering a lost love. She then takes a walk along the Seine, wearing a Red dress with white flower appliques and blue peep toes and sits beside the river Seine. The video draws comparison to that of singer Adele's music video "Someone Like You" and Swift's own "Back to December".

Swift then rides a bicycle, wearing a blue and white floral skirt with white cat flats with sun glasses on and bikes down a Cobblestone street. She goes shopping and tries on new clothes, which is spliced with shots of Swift singing to a man (Vladimir Perrin). In a flashback, she recalls her first meeting with the man at a café while sipping cappuccino. He starts taking snapshots of her with his Leica M6. They then have a bitter-sweet conversation, laughing and giggling at each other. The following clips shows Swift sitting at a park and sampling pastries. It also shows Swift walking by the Seine. The clip ends with the two walking side by side, as Swift allows herself to "begin again."

Directed by Philip Andelman and produced by Arthur Cantin, the story in the video deviates from the song's lyrical narrative in several respects. While the lyrics recount the narrator's (Swift) trepidation of a first date after a bad breakup, the video instead relates a chance meeting in a cafe in Paris.  In the video, Swift is seated at a booth, doodling in a small notebook when a Frenchman at another table takes interest and introduces himself. Missing from the video are the Swift's initial moments in the cafe, where her date has arrived early to wait for her, greets her, then helps her into her chair, displaying kindness and respect that was apparently absent from her former relationship. Late in the song, the restaurant encounter draws to a conclusion while the couple walks to Swift's car.

Entertainment Weekly thought the video was “another classic bittersweet Swift joint,” writing: “Though her boyfriend doesn't laugh at her jokes and bores her with stories about his family’s Christmas movie-watching traditions, she finds the ultimate salve: Wandering through the streets of Paris, chuckling with handsome dudes in a café (and probably snacking on snails or something). It’s a lovely clip, but a little bit sleepy. Also, there’s something about it that recalls ’Back to December’ — is it the color palette, or just the general moodiness?”.

Live performances
Swift performed "Begin Again" at the 2012 Country Music Association Awards on November 1, in Nashville. The performance mirrored the music video, with Swift, dressed in red, singing on a Parisian café-inspired stage with an accordion player. Grady Smith from Entertainment Weekly said that although Swift does not possess a powerful voice like her contemporaries, "when it's set in the right place ... I find Swift's tone gently evocative and rather soothing".

Credits and personnel
Adapted from Red album liner notes

Taylor Swift – lead vocals, writer, producer
Dann Huff – producer, electric guitar, digital editing, acoustic guitar
Nathan Chapman – producer, acoustic guitar, high string acoustic guitar
Steve Marcantonio – recording
Seth Morton – assistant recording
Justin Niebank – mixing
Drew Bollman – assistant mixing
Mike "Frog" Griffith – production coordinator
Jason Campbell – production coordinator
Tom Bukovac – electric guitar
Paul Franklin – steel guitar
Ilya Toshinsky – mandolin
Jimmie Lee Sloas – bass
Jonathan Yudkin – violin, string
Charlie Judge – Hammond B3, synthesizers, strings, accordion, piano
Aaron Sterling – drums
Caitlin Evanson – background vocals

Charts

Weekly charts

Year-end charts

Certifications

Release history

"Begin Again (Taylor's Version)"

A re-recorded version of "Begin Again", titled "Begin Again (Taylor's Version)", was released as part of Swift's re-recording album Red (Taylor's Version), on November 12, 2021, through Republic Records. The re-recording peaked at number 76 on the Billboard Global 200.

Personnel
Adapted from Red (Taylor's Version) liner notes
 Taylor Swift – lead vocals, songwriter, producer
 Christopher Rowe – producer, vocals engineer
 David Payne – recording engineer
 Dan Burns – additional engineer
 Austin Brown – assistant engineer, assistant editor
 Bryce Bordone – engineer
 Derek Garten – engineer
 Serban Ghenea – mixer
 Charles Judge – accordion
 Mike Meadows – acoustic guitar, Hammond organ, mandolin
 Amos Heller – bass guitar
 Matt Billingslea – drums
 Paul Sidoti – electric guitar
 David Cook – piano
 Max Bernstein – steel guitar, synths
 Jonathan Yudkin – violin
 Caitlin Evanson – background vocals

Charts

See also
 List of number-one digital songs of 2012 (U.S.)

References

Source

2012 singles
2012 songs
Taylor Swift songs
Country ballads
Songs written by Taylor Swift
Song recordings produced by Taylor Swift
Song recordings produced by Dann Huff
Song recordings produced by Nathan Chapman (record producer)
Song recordings produced by Chris Rowe
Big Machine Records singles
Music videos directed by Philip Andelman
2010s ballads
American soft rock songs